Cineaste (or cinéaste) may refer to:
A cinema enthusiast; a cinephile
A person involved in filmmaking
Cineaste (magazine), a quarterly periodical about films
Cinéast(e)s, a 2013 documentary film about women filmmakers

nl:Cineast